Grover Harmon (born 9 August 1989) is a footballer from Cook Islands. He plays as a midfielder for Tupapa Maraerenga in Cook Islands Round Cup. He played for Cook Islands at 2014 FIFA World Cup qualifiers.

Prive life
Grover is the son of Lee Harmon, the president of the Cook Islands Football Association.

Career statistics

International

Statistics accurate as of match played 2 September 2015

International goals
Scores and results list. Cook Islands's goal tally first.

Honours
Nikao Sokattak
Cook Islands Round Cup (3): 2011, 2012, 2014
Cook Islands Cup (1): 2013

References

External links 
 

1989 births
Living people
Cook Islands international footballers
Association football midfielders
Cook Island footballers